Lucky Boy is a 2017 novel written by Shanthi Sekaran and her second book.

Plot
Soli, an eighteen-year-old woman, enters the United States illegally from Mexico and an Indian American woman named Kavya struggles to have a baby with her husband, who works in Silicon Valley. The two stories converge around a baby, the "lucky boy".

Reception
Steph Cha of USA Today wrote "It’s easy to imagine the lives of these characters even off the page. Lucky Boy pulses with vitality, pumped with the life breath of human sin and love."

Kathleen Rooney of the Chicago Tribune said "In her sweeping, deep and strikingly compassionate second novel, 'Lucky Boy,' Shanthi Sekaran weaves these two elemental narratives with emotionally arresting aplomb."

In 2018, Lucky Boy was a finalist for the William Saroyan International Prize for Writing and was longlisted for the Aspen Words Literary Prize.

Television series
A television series based on Lucky Boy is being developed by UnbelEVAble Entertainment, starring Eva Longoria and David Schulner.

References

2017 American novels
G. P. Putnam's Sons books
English-language novels